Lajinha may refer to:

Lajinha, a municipality in the state of Minas Gerais, Brazil
Lajinha (beach), a beach in the island of São Vicente, Cape Verde
O mar na Lajinha, a novel published in 2004 by Germano Almeida